Backbower is an area in Tameside, England.

Geography of Tameside